Tommy Collins may refer to:

 Tommy Collins (filmmaker) (died 2022), Irish filmmaker
 Tommy Collins (singer) (1930–2000), American country music singer and songwriter

See also
 Thomas Collins (disambiguation)
 Tom Collins (disambiguation)